The Sudan Tribune is an electronic news portal on Sudan and South Sudan and neighbouring countries including news coverage, analyses and commentary, official reports and press releases from various organizations, and maps. It is based in Paris, France, and run by a team of Sudanese and international editors and journalists. The Sudan Tribune claims to have had over 5 million page views in 2005 and more than 12 million page views (almost a million absolute unique visitors) in 2008.

History
The Sudan Tribune was started in 2003. In July 2017, the South Sudanese media accused the government of blocking their websites.

References

External links
Sudan Tribune Website
Satenaw News Website

Internet properties established in 2005
Sudanese news websites
Mass media in South Sudan
French news websites